Brett O'Hanlon (born 17 July 1993) is an Australian rules footballer currently playing for the Richmond Football Club in the Australian Football League (AFL).

O'Hanlon was drafted from the Dandenong Stingrays in the TAC Cup with the ninth selection in the 2012 AFL Preseason Draft.

He made his AFL debut for Richmond against  in Round 11 of the 2012 AFL season as the substitute player, replacing Ben Griffiths at three-quarter time.
O'Hanlon played the 2021 VFL Season for the Frankston Football Club.

References

External links

Living people
1993 births
Dandenong Stingrays players
Australian rules footballers from Victoria (Australia)
Richmond Football Club players
Coburg Football Club players
Frankston Football Club players